Class Trip is an album by guitarist John Abercrombie with violinist Mark Feldman, bassist Marc Johnson, and drummer Joey Baron recorded in 2003 and released on the ECM label

Reception
The Allmusic review by Thom Jurek awarded the album 4½ stars, stating, "On Class Trip, the bandmembers come together fully and build on that concept with such beauty and grace that they sound as if they've been playing together all their lives. The sheer subtle intuition that guides these proceedings is breathtaking... This band is concerned only with the articulation and expression of a musicality that lies not in the obviousness of its contributors' considerable musical gifts as jazz improvisers, but in the sheer nuanced elegance of an ensemble whose blurring of traditions under the rubric of improvisation makes the group not only compelling but brilliant. Abercrombie's compositions for this band are the most adventurous and graceful of his long career; as a unit, the quartet is a band without peers that plays a music whose challenge is only eclipsed by its accessibility and singular language".

John Kelman of All About Jazz commented, "His latest quartet release, Class Trip, delivers on that promise with an album that raises the bar even further, and never fails to make the leap." The Penguin Guide to Jazz awarded the album 4 stars, stating, "Class Trip is quiet, thoughtful and about as remote from the current axis of American jazz guitar".

Track listing
All compositions by John Abercrombie except as indicated.

 "Dansir" – 9:31 
 "Risky Business" – 7:38 
 "Descending Grace" – 8:56 
 "Illinoise"  (John Abercrombie, Joey Baron, Mark Feldman, Marc Johnson) – 5:35 
 "Cat Walk" – 7:55 
 "Excuse My Shoes" – 8:28 
 "Swirls" – 6:06 
 "Jack and Betty" – 3:39 
 "Class Trip" – 7:29 
 "Soldier's Song" (Béla Bartók) – 3:02
 "Epilogue" (Abercrombie, Baron, Feldman, Johnson) – 3:37

Personnel
John Abercrombie – guitar
Mark Feldman – violin
Marc Johnson – bass
Joey Baron – drums

References

ECM Records albums
John Abercrombie (guitarist) albums
2004 albums
Albums produced by Manfred Eicher